New York City DOE District 22 was a district in New York City encompassing New York City Public Schools in Brooklyn. However, districts were abolished in 2002 when the school system was reorganized.

Elementary

 P.S. 109 (K109) Grades: 0K,01,02,03,04,05,06,07,08,SE 
 P.S. 206 Joseph F Lamb (K206) Grades: PK,0K,01,02,03,04,05,06,07,08,SE
 P.S. 207 Elizabeth G. Leary (K207) Grades: PK,0K,01,02,03,04,05,06,07,SE

High schools
 Midwood High School
 James Madison High School
 Sheepshead Bay High School
 Leon M. Goldstein High School for the Sciences
 Brooklyn College Academy
 South Shore High School (scheduled to close in 2010)

References
Notes

New York City Department of Education
Education in Brooklyn